This is a list of contestants who have appeared on the reality television competition, The Voice UK. Only contestants successfully picked by a coach are included here.

Key:
 Winner
 Runner-up
 Third/Fourth place
 Fourth place 
 Eliminated by the public vote 
 Eliminated in the Live Shows
 Eliminated in the Knockout Rounds
 Eliminated in the Battle/Callbacks Rounds
 Withdrew
 Participating

|}

Voice UK contestants, The